The 1923 Mississippi A&M Aggies football team represented the Mississippi A&M Aggies of Agricultural and Mechanical College of the State of Mississippi during the 1923 college football season.

Schedule

References

Mississippi State Bulldogs football seasons
Mississippi AandM
1923 in sports in Mississippi